Jan Murray (1916–2006) was an American stand-up comedian, actor, and game show host. 

Jan Murray may also refer to:

 Jan Murray (entrepreneur), British entrepreneur
 Janice Murray (footballer) (born 1966), English footballer
 Jan Murray (public relations consultant) (born 1942), Australian public relations consultant
 Jan Murray, a character from the British soap opera Brookside